The Mauritania national football team, nicknamed Al-Murabitun in the reference to Almoravid dynasty, represents Mauritania in men's international football. It is controlled by the Féderation de Football de la République Islamique de Mauritanie, and is a member of the Confederation of African Football. They have not qualified for the FIFA World Cup. However, in the Amílcar Cabral Cup, a regional tournament for West Africa, Mauritania came forth in 1980 on hosting the competition. The national football team of Mauritania later runners-up in 1995, losing on penalties to Sierra Leone after the final finished 0–0.

On 18 November 2018, Mauritania qualified for the Africa Cup of Nations for the first time in history, after they won 2–1 against Botswana to seal a spot in the 2019 tournament.

History

1963–80
Mauritania played its first match after independence from France on 11 April 1963, against Congo Kinshasa (also making their debut) and lost 6–0. The match was held in Dakar, Senegal as part of the L'Amitié tournament between African sides. It also saw the debuts of Chad, Liberia and Niger. Mauritania lost its three other matches in the tournament: 2–0 to the Ivory Coast, 4–0 to Tunisia and 7–0 to Congo Brazzaville.

Mauritania's first goal and avoidance of defeat came four years after their debut, in 1967 with a 1–1 draw away in Tanzania. This was their first match since the L'Amitié tournament in 1963.

Mauritania entered their first African Games qualification campaign, in an aim to reach the 1973 finals in Nigeria. They were drawn in a group against Mali and Guinea in Guinea. The first game was lost 11–0 to Mali, and on 20 May Mauritania lost 14–0 to Guinea. Mauritania did not qualify.

In May 1976 Mauritania entered qualification for the football at the 1976 Summer Olympics in Canada. They were drawn against neighbouring Mali in a two-legged qualifier. The first leg was lost 6–0 away on 1 May, and the second leg was lost 1–0 at home on 18 May. Mali did not qualify for the finals.

Mauritania's first entrance into World Cup qualification was an attempt to reach the 1978 FIFA World Cup in Argentina. In March 1976 they were one of four countries put into two preliminary matches at the start of the African qualification campaign. Mauritania's preliminary was a two-legged match against the Upper Volta (now Burkina Faso) and they drew the first match 1–1 away in Ouagadougou on 13 March. This was their first competitive avoidance of defeat, and their first avoidance of defeat since 1967. On 28 March, Mauritania lost their home leg in Nouakchott 2–0 and the Upper Volta advanced 3–1 on aggregate.

On 12 October 1980, seventeen years after their first game, Mauritania won for the first time by beating Mali 2–1 at home in a qualifier for the African Cup of Nations. Mali won 3–2 on aggregate having won the first leg 2–0.

1998 FIFA World Cup qualification
Mauritania entered qualification for the 1998 FIFA World Cup in France, which was their first entry in twenty years and second overall. Again, they were drawn to face Burkina Faso in a two-legged preliminary. The first leg was played at home in Nouakchott in front of 15,000 people on 31 May 1996, one day before any other matches in the round. The match finished 0–0. The second leg was played at the Stade du 4-Aout in Ouagadougou on 16 June 1996 in front of 13,000 people. Burkina Faso won 2–0 to advance to the final group phase.

2002 FIFA World Cup qualification
Mauritania entered the qualification for the 2002 FIFA World Cup and were placed in a preliminary against Tunisia, who had qualified for the previous tournament. On 7 April 2000 they hosted Tunisia at the Stade Olympique in Nouakchott. A crowd of 10,000 saw Tunisia win 2–1 with second-half goals from Radhi Jaidi and Hassen Gabsi. In the second leg on 22 April 2000, Mauritania were beaten 3–0 at the Stade El Menzah in Tunis. The match was watched by only 3,000, despite a capacity of 45,000 in the ground. Tunisia won 5–1 on aggregate and later qualified for the finals in South Korea and Japan.

2006 FIFA World Cup qualification
Mauritania were drawn with Zimbabwe in the preliminary of the African section of the 2006 FIFA World Cup qualification. On 12 October 2003 they lost the away leg 3–0 at the National Sports Stadium in Harare in front of 55,000 people. In the home return at the Stade Olympique on 14 November 2003, Mauritania scored twice in the opening ten minutes to win 2–1, their first victory in a World Cup match. However, Zimbabwe advanced 4–2 on aggregate.

2010 FIFA World Cup qualification
The African qualification process was altered for the 2010 FIFA World Cup. Only the six lowest-ranked nations played a preliminary, a selection which for the first time did not include Mauritania. Mauritania played in Group 8 of the second qualifying round against Rwanda, Morocco and Ethiopia, and started with an away match at the Stade Regional Nyamirambo in Kigali, Rwanda on 31 May 2008. They lost 3–0 in front of 12,000 people. The first home match was on 7 June at the Stade Nacional in Nouakchott against Morocco. The Moroccans scored two in each half before a late penalty by Dominique da Silva of Mauritania made the game 4–1.

On 13 June 2008 Mauritania hosted Ethiopia at the Stade Nacional and lost 1–0 after an injury-time winner from Saladin Said. On 22 June Mauritania lost 6–1 in the away match versus Ethiopia at the Addis Ababa Stadium. The Ethiopian forwards Fikru Tefera and Andualem Nigussie scored two goals each in a match which also saw Ba Yaoub of Mauritania sent off after 37 minutes, conceding a penalty to Fikru. The game was 1–1 at half time. In September 2008 Ethiopia were expelled from the tournament due to government interferences in their football association and all of their results annulled.

Only 1,000 people saw Mauritania's next game at the Stade Nacional as they were beaten 1–0 by Rwanda on 6 September with a late goal by Bobo Bola. Mauritania finished their group campaign at the Stade Moulay Abdellah in Rabat, Morocco. Like the home game against the Moroccans, Mauritania were 4–0 down but scored the last goal, this time by Dahmed Ould Teguedi. Although the Moroccan stadium had a capacity of 52,000, only 1,472 saw the match.

2015 Africa Cup of Nations qualification

Mauritania beat Mauritius 1–0 in the first leg of a preliminary round qualifier for the 2015 Africa Cup of Nations in Nouakchott.
SC Bastia's midfielder Adama Ba scored the only goal midway through the first half. The return leg in Curepipe ended 2–0 in favour of Mauritania. Scorers were Demba Sow and Moulaye Ahmed Bessam.

In the first round, first leg match, Mauritania beat visitors Equatorial Guinea 1–0 in Nouakchott. The two sides headed into the break scoreless in their match played at Office du Complexe Olympique de Nouakchott. Hosts Mauritania broke the deadlock in the 76th minute through their Tunisian-based striker Ismaël Diakité. In the return match Equatorial Guinea beat Mauritania 3–0 in Malabo. Equatorial Guinea won 3–1 on aggregate. However, on 3 July 2014, the CAF announced that Equatorial Guinea were disqualified for fielding the ineligible player Thierry Fidjeu in the tie, and as a result, Mauritania advanced to the second round. Equatorial Guinea later qualified for the final tournament as replacement hosts.

2019 Africa Cup of Nations
On 18 November 2018, Mauritania qualified to the 2019 Africa Cup of Nations for the first time in their history, after they won 2–1 against Botswana, coming second in qualification Group I.

Team image

The Mauritania national team home kit is all green yellow red trim, and the away kit is all white with green trim.

Results and fixtures

2021

2022

2023

Coaches

 Mohamed Harouna (1982–1983)
 Gerhard Schmidt (1985)
 Birama Gaye (2000)
 Noël Tosi (2003–2004)
 Moustapha Sall (2006–2007)
 Birama Gaye (2007)
 Alain Moizan (2008)
 Mohamed Harouna (2008)
 Omar Hassan (2010)
 Moustapha Sall (2010–2012)
 Patrice Neveu (2012–2014)
 Corentin Martins (2014–2021)
 Gérard Buscher (2021)
 Didier Gomes Da Rosa (2021–2022)
 Amir Abdou (2022–present)

Players

Current squad
 The following players were called up for the 2023 Africa Cup of Nations qualification matches.
 Match dates: 24 and 28 March 2023
 Opposition: 
 Caps and goals correct as of:' 27 January 2023, after the match against .

Recent call-ups
The following players have been called up for Mauritania in the last 12 months.

DEC Player refused to join the team after the call-up.
INJ Player withdrew from the squad due to an injury.
PRE Preliminary squad.
RET Player has retired from international football.
SUS Suspended from the national team.

RecordsPlayers in bold are still active with Mauritania.''

Competitive record

FIFA World Cup

Olympic Games

Football at the Summer Olympics has been an under-23 tournament since the 1992 edition.

Africa Cup of Nations

African Games

 Prior to the Cairo 1991 campaign, the Football at the All-Africa Games was open to full senior national teams.

African Nations Championship

WAFU Nations Cup

Amílcar Cabral Cup

CEDEAO Cup

FIFA Arab Cup

Pan Arab Games

Other records

References

External links

 Mauritania at National-Football-Teams.com.
 Fédération de Football de Mauritanie
 Mauritanie Football
 National football team of Mauritania team picture

 
African national association football teams